Suvorovsky District  is an administrative district (raion), one of the twenty-three in Tula Oblast, Russia. Within the framework of municipal divisions, it is incorporated as Suvorovsky Municipal District. It is located in the west of the oblast. Its administrative center is the town of Suvorov. Population: 37,637 (2010 Census);  The population of Suvorov accounts for 50.4% of the district's total population.

References

Notes

Sources

Districts of Tula Oblast